Coliseo Rubén Rodríguez (English: Ruben Rodríguez Coliseum) is an indoor sporting arena in Puerto Rico. The coliseum was dedicated to Rubén Rodríguez (former player of the Vaqueros de Bayamón). It is located in Bayamón, Puerto Rico. It can accommodate up to 12,000 spectators and can be reached by the Tren Urbano system from the Deportivo station.

Event uses and history
This coliseum had been used for events like:
 Basketball games (Hosting the Bayamón Cowboys professional team)
 Boxing
 Professional wrestling
 Volleyball
 Kickboxing
 Varied shows
 Other sports

In 2021, the Rubén Rodríguez Coliseum received a $1.1 million allocation of funds for renovations.

References

Buildings and structures in Bayamón, Puerto Rico
Indoor arenas in Puerto Rico
Basketball venues in Puerto Rico
Volleyball venues in Puerto Rico
Boxing venues in Puerto Rico
Mixed martial arts venues in Puerto Rico
1988 establishments in Puerto Rico
Sports venues completed in 1988